The LEN Euroleague 2008–09 was the 46th edition of Europe's premier club water polo competition.

1st qualification round

Group A (Košice)

Group B (Porto)

Group C (Koper)

Group D (Šibenik)

2nd qualification round

Group E (Marseille)

Group F (Herceg Novi)

Group G (Duisburg)

Group H (Eger)

Preliminary round

Group A

Group B

Group C

Group D

Knockout stage

Quarter-finals
The first legs were played on 4 April, and the second legs were played on 22 April 2009.

Final Four

Final standings

External links
 Champions League 2008/2009 results

See also
 2008–09 LEN Trophy

2008 in water polo
2009 in water polo
LEN Champions League seasons
Champions League